Ryszard Skowronek (born 1 May 1949 in Jelenia Góra) is a retired decathlete from Poland. He set his personal best in the event (8208  points) on 21 June 1973 at a meet in Warsaw.

Achievements

References

External links 
 
 
 
 
 
 trackfield.brinkster

1949 births
Living people
Polish decathletes
Athletes (track and field) at the 1972 Summer Olympics
Athletes (track and field) at the 1976 Summer Olympics
Olympic athletes of Poland
People from Jelenia Góra
European Athletics Championships medalists
Sportspeople from Lower Silesian Voivodeship
Universiade medalists in athletics (track and field)
Universiade gold medalists for Poland
Medalists at the 1973 Summer Universiade